Whenby is a civil parish, and small village, in Hambleton district of North Yorkshire, England.

Whenby lies between Sheriff Hutton and Brandsby, on Main Street, and a little to the east of the Howardian Hills. There is a track that leads from Main Street to St Martin's Church. This track has the village's telephone box (old, red and falling down!), post box, and village notice board on it. The village has nothing else but houses and farms.

Whenby has approximately 14 houses, most of these are old cottages, and all but 3 are on the north and east side of Main Street. All surrounding land is farmland, and strict planning permissions prevent any development. The surface is undulating, and the soil generally a rich clay loam.

St Martin's Church is a redundant Anglican church, which still has its stained glass windows and fittings. It was built around 1400, and has a chancel, north aisle, porch, nave, mortuary chapel, and a tower, containing three bells. It was restored, at a cost of £700, in 1871, when a north aisle of stone was added. The principal entrance is by the north porch, through a handsome Norman doorway. There is a doorway of ancient date, which is generally supposed to have been used for public access to the church, or in connection with the priest's house. It is a grade II* listed building.

References

External links

Villages in North Yorkshire
Civil parishes in North Yorkshire